The Triangulum subgroup is made up of the Triangulum Galaxy (M33) and its satellites. Although the Triangulum Galaxy does not have any proven satellite galaxies, a number of galaxies are suspected of being in the system.

Andromeda XXII
Andromeda XXII is located much closer in projection to M33 than M31 (42 kiloparsecs (140 kly) vs. 224 kiloparsecs (730 kly)). This fact suggests that it might be the first Triangulum (M33) satellite ever discovered. However, it is currently catalogued as a satellite of Andromeda (M31).

Pisces Dwarf
Pisces Dwarf is an irregular dwarf galaxy that is part of the Local Group. The galaxy is also suspected of being a satellite galaxy of the Triangulum Galaxy.

Andromeda II
Andromeda II is a dwarf spheroidal galaxy about 2.22 Mly away in the constellation Andromeda. It is part of the Local group of galaxies and is a satellite galaxy of the Andromeda Galaxy (M31) but it is also situated closely to the Triangulum Galaxy (M33), it is not quite clear if it is a satellite of the one or the other galaxy.

Pisces VII
Pisces VII, also known as Triangulum III, is a candidate ultra-faint dwarf galaxy in the constellation of Pisces. Its distance has been preliminarily found to be 3.3 Mly, meaning it could be associated with the Triangulum Galaxy.

Data

References

Local Group
Triangulum (constellation)